Rear Admiral Dwika Tjahja Setiawan (born 24 September 1966) is a commodore in the Indonesian Navy who served as its chief of staff (Indonesian: Kepala Staf Angkatan Laut, abbreviated KSAL or Kasal) in the navy's Military Sealift Command.

Career 
He graduated from the Indonesian Naval Academy in 1990 as a Navy pilot. As an aviator, he mostly served in the air wing and air bases at the Eastern Indonesian Fleet Command and the Indonesian Navy Aviation Center. Initially, after graduating as the first officer of the Navy with the rank of Second Lieutenant with the Marine Corps, he served on KRI Tanjung Oisina and KRI Mentawai. However, his career path changed to become a Navy pilot, after in 1994 he attended an aviation officer education.

After graduating from pilot school, since then most of his career has been spent in the Indonesian Navy's aviation environment, starting with the 400 Squadron of the Eastern Fleet Air Unit, Juanda Air Base, Air Wing I, Air Wing II and Puspenerbal.

Awards 

 Bintang Yudha Dharma Nararya

 Satyalancana Kesetiaan 24 years' service

 Satyalancana Kesetiaan 16 years' service

 Satyalancana Kesetiaan 8 years' service

 Satyalancana Dharma Nusa

 Satyalancana Wira Nusa

 Satyalancana Wira Dharma

 Satyalancana Dwidya Sistha (2 stars)

 Satyalancana Kebhaktian Sosial

Position 

 Commander of the 400th Air Squadron
 Commander of the Indonesian Navy Aviation School
 Commander of the Lanal Pontianak
 Air Wing Commander II
 Air Wing Commander I (2014—2016)
 Deputy Commander of Lantamal IV/Tanjung Pinang (2016—2017)
 Commander of Puspenerbal (2017—2019)
 Senior Officer of the Chief of Expert Staff for the Field of Science and Technology (2019)
 Kaskolinlamil (2019—)

See also 

 Indonesian military ranks

References 

1966 births
Living people
Indonesian admirals
People from Medan
Chiefs of Staff of the Indonesian Navy